Closer to God is a 2014 American science fiction horror film produced by and starring Jeremy Childs.

Plot
Dr. Victor Reed (Jeremy Childs) is a humorlessly committed biological scientist with a privately funded genetic experimental laboratory secreted away on a locked floor in a hospital. We first encounter him as he's delivering Elizabeth, a seemingly normal infant who's nonetheless very special as the first of her kind. Reluctantly if cryptically announcing this breakthrough to the public (he refuses to name anyone involved in the baby's conception or birth besides himself, or to let her be seen as yet), he braves an immediate firestorm of pushy press inquiries, as well as outrage from those who believe such scientific explorations represent a grave offense against God and nature. Others note the great medical advances that cloning might help instigate, but they're generally shouted down by the pious and appalled.

The outcry is such that government authorities are pressured to drum up criminal charges against Victor. Worried about security, he transfers the baby from the lab to his own home, a gated country estate where wife Claire (Shannon Hoppe) is already fed up with his workaholic neglect of their own “normal” family, including two preschool daughters. While she can't help but take a maternal interest in Elizabeth, the tense atmosphere worsens as protestors and media discover the baby's new location — as leaked by lab assistant Laura (Emily Landham), who has serious ethical and safety worries over the doctor's treatment of his experimental progeny.

Perhaps even more perilous than the rising clamor outside, however, is a ticking time bomb within: A couple (Shelean Newman, David Alford) who work for the household are also charged with minding a murkily explained older child who is evidently the product of a less successful, earlier cloning attempt. Kept in barred quarters away from the main building (and little seen until the end), the increasingly violent, misshapen Ethan (Isaac Disney) inevitably busts out to go on a rampage, terrorizing all in the climactic reel.

Cast
Jeremy Childs as Victor
Shelean Newman as Mary
Shannon Hoppe as Claire
David Alford as Richard
Isaac Disney as Ethan
Olivia Lyle as Elizabeth
Jake Speck as James
Emily Landham as Laura
Josh Graham as Man
John Schuck as Sydney
Joshua Childs as David
Piper Hoppe as Rachael
Anna Garges as Rebecca

Production
In addition to acting in and producing the film, Childs also served as the casting director.

Reception
The film has a 50% rating on Rotten Tomatoes.  Wes Greene of Slant Magazine gave the film two stars out of four.  Dann Gire of the Daily Herald awarded the film two stars.  John Anderson of IndieWire graded the film a B.

References

External links
 
 

2014 horror films
American science fiction horror films
2010s English-language films
2010s American films